Anulifera is an extinct genus of fossil sea snails, marine gastropod molluscs in the family Protorculidae. In 2012, a new species, A. chubutensis, was described from the Early Jurassic period, (late Pliensbachian-early Toarcian) of Argentina by S. Mariel Ferrari.

Species
Species within the genus Anulifera include:
Anulifera chubatensis Ferrari, 2012

References

Prehistoric gastropod genera
Gastropods described in 2012